Arajadzor is a village in the Kapan Municipality of the Syunik Province in Armenia.

Demographics 
The National Statistical Service of the Republic of Armenia (ARMSTAT) reported its population as 164 in 2010, down from 208 at the 2001 census.

Gallery

References 

Populated places in Syunik Province